The United Local School District is a public school district serving western Columbiana County in the U.S. state of Ohio.

United High School is the only high school in the district.  The schools' sports teams are nicknamed the "Golden Eagles". The district's colors are navy and gold.

Schools
 United Elementary School – grades K-5
 United Middle School – grades 6-8
 United High School – grades 9-12

References

Education in Columbiana County, Ohio
School districts in Ohio
Public schools in Ohio